Chaniece Wallace (1990 − October 22, 2020), a black woman and physician, died at 30 years of age from complications of pregnancy two days after giving birth. Her death is seen as preventable and is viewed in the context of high rates of maternal mortality in the United States, particularly among the African American population. It is cited as an example in medical and scholarly publications to call for improved health outcomes in the black U.S. population.

Wallace was a fourth year pediatric chief resident at the Indiana University School of Medicine and was working at Riley Children's Health Hospital at the time of her death. She died from complications after an emergency caesarean section in the setting of pre-eclampsia. Hypertensive disease of pregnancy (from pre-eclampsia) with liver rupture and kidney damage contributed to her death. Wallace's death was honored at the 2020 meeting of American College of Obstetricians and Gynecologists by a moment of silence. She was a native of Alabama and completed her undergraduate and medical doctor degrees at the University of Alabama.

Lindsey Carr, associate editor of Contemporary OB/GYN, commented that Wallace's death "highlights the glaring racial disparities in maternal mortality and morbidity for Black women in the U.S. The pregnancy-related mortality rate for Black women is 5.2 times higher than for white women, and the rates of maternal mortality and severe maternal morbidity are 3 to 4 times higher in Black women than in white women."

See also
 Implicit bias
 Death of Sha-Asia Washington

References

2020 deaths
2020 in Indiana
Deaths by person in Indiana
Deaths in childbirth
Healthcare in Indiana
Medical controversies in the United States
Medical error
October 2020 events in the United States